Hoseyn Ali may refer to:
 Ali Hoseyni
 Aqa Qoli